Obadiah J. Barker, Jr. (October 31, 1856 – July 1908) was a Los Angeles business man and the founder and president of the furniture company, Barker Brothers.  Born in Bloomfield, Indiana, Barker moved with his family to Colorado Springs, Colorado as a young man.  He attended Colorado College and also attended dental school in St. Louis.  However, he did not complete dental school and moved to Los Angeles with his parents and brothers in 1880.  The family began a successful furniture business on Spring Street in Los Angeles.  The company became one of the world's biggest house-furnishing stores.  Barker died suddenly at the Lankershim Hotel in July 1908 at age 51.

References

1856 births
1908 deaths
Businesspeople from Los Angeles
People from Bloomfield, Indiana
Businesspeople from Colorado Springs, Colorado
Colorado College alumni
19th-century American businesspeople